Sandra Cecchini was the defending champion but did not compete that year.

Second-seeded Jana Novotná won in the final 6–1, 6–2 against Patricia Tarabini.

Seeds
A champion seed is indicated in bold text while text in italics indicates the round in which that seed was eliminated.

  Katerina Maleeva (first round)
  Jana Novotná (champion)
  Susan Sloane (quarterfinals)
  Bettina Fulco (quarterfinals)
  Nicole Provis (second round)
  Judith Wiesner (second round)
  Gretchen Magers (quarterfinals)
  Ann Grossman (quarterfinals)

Draw

External links
 1989 Internationaux de Strasbourg draw

1989
1989 WTA Tour
1989 in French tennis